The 2019-20 SDHL Season was the 13th season of the Swedish Women's Hockey League (SDHL). The season began in September 2019 and ended in February 2020. The playoffs began a week after the end of the regular season, but the finals were cancelled due to the 2019–20 coronavirus outbreak. 

HV71 were regular season champions, and due to face Luleå HF/MSSK in the finals. Göteborg HC and Modo Hockey finished at the bottom of the table, but were able to avoid relegation to Damettan in the Playoffs to the SDHL.

Brynäs IF defender Lara Stalder led the league in points with 71 and was named league MVP. The highest attended match of the season came on 24 November 2019, with 3622 spectators turning out to watch Linköping HC host Luleå HF/MSSK.

Regular season   

Each team plays 36 games, with three points being awarded for winning in regulation time, two points for winning in overtime or shootout, one point for losing in overtime or shootout, and zero points for losing in regulation time. At the end of the regular season, the team that finishes with the most points is crowned the league champion.

Standings

Statistics

Scoring Leaders    

The following shows the top ten players who led the league in points, at the conclusion of the regular season. If two or more skaters are tied (i.e. same number of points, goals and played games), all of the tied skaters are shown.

Leading goaltenders 
The following shows the top ten goaltenders who led the league in goals against average, provided that they have played at least 40% of their team's minutes, at the conclusion of the regular season.

SDHL Awards

See also 
 Women's ice hockey in Sweden

References

External links 
 League website

SDHL
2019–20 in European ice hockey leagues
Women's ice hockey competitions in Sweden
SDHL
Swedish Women's Hockey League seasons